The Night Before Christmas (Noch pered Rozhdestvom) is a 1951 Russian animated feature film directed by the "grandmothers of the Russian animation", Brumberg sisters, and produced by the Soyuzmultfilm studio in Moscow. The film is based on Nikolai Gogol's 1832 story "The Night Before Christmas". 

The animation features heavy use of rotoscoping, known as "Éclair" in the Soviet Union, and is an example of the Socialist-Realist period in Russian animation. The film is in the public domain in Russia and is widely available on numerous Home video and DVD releases, mostly along with other films.

Plot
Action of the animated film happens in Dykanka, in Ukraine. Noticed by nobody, in the sky two are turned: the witch on a sweeper which gathers stars in a sleeve, and the devil who hides moon in a pocket, thinking that the come darkness will keep houses of the rich Cossack the Chub invited to the clerk on kutia and hated to the devil the smith Vakula (who painted a picture of the Last Judgement and the  devil on a church wall) won't dare to come to the Chub's daughter Oksana.

The forelock with the godfather isn't known whether to go in such darkness to the clerk, however decide and left. The beauty Oksana stays at home. Vakula comes, but Oksana urges on him. The gone astray Forelock, without godfather, decided to come back home because of the blizzard arranged with the devil knocks at the door. However, having heard the smith, the Forelock decides that got to other hut. The forelock goes to Vakula's mother, Solokha who and is that witch who stole stars from the sky.

To Oksana her girlfriends come. On one of them Oksana notices the cherevichks embroidered by gold (that is shoes) and is proud declares that will marry Vakula if that brings it cherevichks, "which the queen carries". In crowd going round carol-singing the smith again meets Oksana who repeats the promise apropos the cherevichks. From Vakul's grief it decides to be drowned, throws all bags, except the smallest, and runs away.

Having slightly calmed down, Vakula wants to try one more means: he comes to the Zaporozhets to Big-bellied Patsyuk who "is similar to the devil" a little, and receives a confused answer that the devil at it behind shoulders. Anticipating nice production, the devil jumps out from a bag and, having mounted upon the smith's neck, promises to it same night Oksana. The cunning smith, having grasped the devil by a tail and having crossed it, becomes a master of the situation and orders to carry to the devil itself to St. Petersburg, directly to the queen.

Having appeared in St. Petersburg, the smith comes to Zaporozhetses with which got acquainted in the fall when they passed through Dykanka. By means of the devil he achieves that it was taken on reception to the queen. Marveling luxury of the palace and strange painting, the smith appears before the queen and asks from it imperial shoes. Touched by such naiveté, Ekaterina pays attention of Denis Fonvizin standing at some distance to this passage, and Vakule gives shoes.

Having returned, the smith takes out a new cap and a belt from a chest and goes to the Forelock with a request to give for it Oksana. The forelock seduced with gifts and angry with perfidy of Solokha's agrees. It is echoed also by Oksana ready to marry the smith "and without chereviks".

Creators

Video
Since the beginning of the 1990s the animated film is released by the film association "Krupnyy Plan" on videotapes. In the mid-nineties the animated film is also released in the VHS collection "The Best Soviet Animated Films" of Studio PRO Video together with other animated films, reissued in 1995 by Soyuz studio on VHS separately.

From the first half of the 2000s the animated film was issued on the disks DVD Soyuz studio, and also entered in one their releases of the collection "Gold Collection of Favourite Animated Films", and in gift editions by New Year and orthodox Christmas.

See also
 History of Russian animation
 List of animated feature films
 The Night Before Christmas (1913 film)

References

External links

 (Russian)
 (Russian with English subtitles)
The Night Before Christmas at the Animator.ru (English and Russian)
The Night Before Christmas at myltik.ru (Russian)

1951 animated films
1951 films
Animated Christmas films
Soviet Christmas films
Films based on works by Nikolai Gogol
Films directed by the Brumberg sisters
Films set in Ukraine
Soviet animated films
1950s Russian-language films
Rotoscoped films
Soyuzmultfilm
1950s Christmas films
Films set in Saint Petersburg
Works based on Christmas Eve (Gogol)